Banking Nature is a documentary that looks at the growing movement to monetize the natural world and to turn endangered species and threatened areas into instruments of profit.

Synopsis
Sandrine Feydel and Denis Delestrac delve into the world of green banking in this documentary, reporting that investors buy up the habitats of endangered species and then sell them in the form of shares. The film includes a montage of images of nature, reflective voice-overs and interviews with bankers, economists, activists and policymakers. The economist Pavan Sukhdev is interviewed, saying nature can best be protected by sticking a price tag on it. Pablo Solon is interviewed saying this subjecting of nature to free market forces as a "license to kill" it. Vandana Shiva is also interviewed.

References

External links
 

2015 television films
2015 films
2015 in the environment
Documentary films about environmental issues
French documentary films
2010s French films